Lantry is an unincorporated community and a census-designated place (CDP) in Dewey County, South Dakota, United States. Lantry has been assigned the ZIP code of 57636. The population of the CDP was 33 at the 2020 census.

According to the Federal Writers' Project, the origin of the name Lantry is obscure.

Demographics

Education
It is in the Eagle Butte School District, which jointly operates Cheyenne-Eagle Butte School with the Bureau of Indian Education (BIE).

References

Unincorporated communities in Dewey County, South Dakota
Unincorporated communities in South Dakota